The Mercedes MGP W01 was a Formula One motor racing car designed and built by the Mercedes GP Petronas team for the  season and was driven by the returning seven-time World Champion Michael Schumacher and Nico Rosberg.

Mercedes buyout and development
 The car was revealed at the Circuit Ricardo Tormo near Valencia at the first official test of the year on February 1. The team's silver livery was officially unveiled at the Mercedes-Benz Museum in Stuttgart on January 25, 2010 on the chassis of a Brawn BGP 001 following Mercedes's purchase of the championship winning team of 2009 marking the team's return to F1 after their last appearance since 1955.

Some parts of the W01 were revised as part of the upgrade at the Spanish GP; increasing the wheelbase of the car to improve the weight distribution, as well as changing the engine cover design. The shorter wheelbase was used again at the next grand prix, deemed more suitable for the narrow streets of the Monaco GP circuit.

Racing history
The team's achievements in their first season did not come close to the results those of Brawn the previous year and of the Mercedes team in 1954 and 1955, with the Mercedes battling Renault for the title of 'best of the rest' behind the leading three teams of Ferrari, McLaren and Red Bull. Rosberg finished on the podium three times, at Sepang, Shanghai and Silverstone. Schumacher's best finishes were three fourth places. He did not score a race win, podium, pole position or fastest lap for the first time since his début season in 1991, and also scored the worst finish of his F1 career at Valencia, where he finished fifteenth. At the last race in Abu Dhabi Schumacher spun while trying to overtake Rosberg and was hit by Vitantonio Liuzzi's Force India.

The team finished fourth in the Constructors' Championship, with 214 points and this was the first Mercedes-Benz powered Formula One car to use non-Mobil branded fuel since 1994.

Complete Formula One results
(key) (results in bold indicate pole position; results in italics indicate fastest lap)

 Driver failed to finish, but was classified as they had completed >90% of the race distance.

References

External links

MGP W01